Jannette Beuving (born 20 June 1965) is a Dutch lawyer, judge, university professor, and politician. She is a member of the Labour Party and has been a member of the Senate from 7 June 2011 to 28 March 2018.

References

External links 
 
 Jannette Beuving (in Dutch) at the Labour Party website
 Jannette Beuving (in Dutch) at the Senate website

1965 births
Living people
20th-century Dutch judges
21st-century Dutch politicians
Dutch women in politics
Dutch women lawyers
Labour Party (Netherlands) politicians
Members of the Senate (Netherlands)
People from Hardenberg
20th-century women lawyers
20th-century Dutch women politicians